Velké Karlovice is a municipality and village in Vsetín District in the Zlín Region of the Czech Republic. It has about 2,300 inhabitants. The municipality lies on the Vsetínská Bečva river.

Administrative parts
The village of Malé Karlovice is an administrative part of Velké Karlovice.

History
Velké Karlovice was founded by Jindřich of Zierotin in 1714.

References

External links

Villages in Vsetín District
1714 establishments in the Holy Roman Empire
Moravian Wallachia